

Queen Elizabeth II Island, formerly Aspen Island, is an artificial island located within Lake Burley Griffin, in Canberra, Australian Capital Territory, Australia. It lies within the Parliamentary Triangle.

The island is located on the south-eastern side of the Central Basin of Lake Burley Griffin and is linked by a footbridge to the mainland at Kings Park. The Australian National Carillon is situated on the island, and the footbridge is named after John Douglas Gordon, who played the inaugural recital. Queen Elizabeth II Island is the largest of three islands at the south-eastern end of the Central Basin. The two smaller adjacent islands are unnamed.

History 
The island was originally gazetted as Aspen Island on 21 November 1963, and named after the aspen tree, of which some are classified by botanists in the section Populus, of the poplar genus.

On 1 January 2022, prime minister Scott Morrison announced that Aspen Island would be renamed Queen Elizabeth II Island in June 2022 as part of the Australian celebrations of the Platinum Jubilee of Elizabeth II, Queen of Australia. The island was renamed on 4 June in a ceremony presided over by the newly elected prime minister Anthony Albanese.

Gallery

See also 

 List of islands of Australia

References 

 

Artificial islands of Australia
Geography of Canberra
Islands of the Australian Capital Territory
Lake islands of Australia
Platinum Jubilee of Elizabeth II
Tourist attractions in Canberra